Gözcüler (former Alakop) is a town in İskenderun district of Hatay Province, Turkey. Although not a coastal town, the distance to Mediterranean Sea coast is only . After the First World War most of Hatay province was occupied by France and the settlement was named as Elvehep referring to a certain Abdülvahap Pasha who owned most of the territory around. After Hatay became a part of Turkey in 1939, the settlement was renamed as Alakop and after 1960 as Gözcüler (literally “watchmen”). Gözcüler was declared a seat of township in 1988. Although most of town revenue is from agriculture, the touristic potential is promising.

References

Populated places in Hatay Province
Towns in Turkey
İskenderun District